For Peete's Sake is an American reality television series starring Holly Robinson Peete, Rodney Peete, their four kids, and her mom, Dolores. It premiered on March 19, 2016 on the Oprah Winfrey Network, as part of its Saturday-night reality lineup. On August 8, 2016, the network renewed the show for a second season. On May 10, 2017, Holly announced on her Instagram account that the show was cancelled after two seasons. t would be succeeded by a new reality series on the Hallmark Channel called Meet the Peetes, which premiered in February 2018 and also ran for two seasons.

Episodes

Season 1 (2016)

Season 2 (2017)

References

External links
 

2010s American black television series
2010s American reality television series
2016 American television series debuts
2017 American television series endings
English-language television shows
Oprah Winfrey Network original programming
Television series about families